Four Foot Shack is the debut album of Duo de Twang, a country music duo formed by Primus bassist and vocalist Les Claypool and M.I.R.V. guitarist Bryan Kehoe. This album contains one original song and fourteen cover songs (although many are covers of Primus or Les Claypool songs). It was released on February 4, 2014 by ATO Records.

Track listing

Song origins

Covers featured on Four Foot Shack and their original artists:
 "Wynona's Big Brown Beaver" by Primus, originally on the album Tales from the Punchbowl.
 "Amos Moses" by Jerry Reed. The song was also covered by Claypool on Primus' Rhinoplasty.
 "Red State Girl" by Les Claypool on Of Fungi and Foe.
 "The Bridge Came Tumblin' Down" by Tom Connors.
 "Booneville Stomp"  by Les Claypool, originally on Of Fungi and Foe.
 "Stayin' Alive" by the Bee Gees.
 "Rumble of the Diesel" by Les Claypool, originally on Of Whales and Woe.
 "Pipeline" by The Chantays.
 "Buzzards of Green Hill" by Colonel Les Claypool's Fearless Flying Frog Brigade, originally appearing on Purple Onion.
 "Hendershot" by Les Claypool, originally on the album Highball with the Devil.
 "Man in the Box" by Alice in Chains.
 "D's Diner" by Les Claypool, originally on Purple Onion.
 "Battle of New Orleans" written by Jimmy Driftwood.
 "Jerry Was a Race Car Driver" by Primus, from the album Sailing the Seas of Cheese.

Personnel
 Les Claypool - Bass, Vocals, Tambourine
 Bryan Kehoe - Guitars & back-up vocals.
 Wylie Woods - Mandolin & back-up vocals (1, 12, 14).
 Recorded at Rancho Relaxo Studio.
 Mastered by Stephen Marcussen for Marcussen Mastering, Hollywood, CA.
 Design & layout by Reuben Rude.
 Cover painting "Stranded Yellow House" by Dave van Patten.
 Photos by Jeremy Scott.

Charts

References

2014 debut albums
Duo de Twang albums
Prawn Song Records albums
ATO Records albums